May 5 - Eastern Orthodox Church calendar - May 7

All fixed commemorations below celebrated on May 19 by Orthodox Churches on the Old Calendar.

For May 6th, Orthodox Churches on the Old Calendar commemorate the Saints listed on April 23.

Saints
 Righteous Job the Long-suffering.
 Martyrs Danax, Mesirus (Mesiurs), and Therin
 Martyrs Demetrius, and Donatus
 Saints Mamas, Pachomius, and Hilarion, monks
 Martyrs Barbarus the Soldier (Barbaruldier), Bacchus, Callimachus, and Dionysius, in Morea (362)
 Martyr Barbarus in Thessaly, the former robber (9th century)

Pre-Schism Western saints
 Saint Lucius of Cyrene (1st century)
 Martyrs Heliodorus and Venustus and seventy-five others in Africa (284–305)
 St. Benedicta, virgin, mystic and nun, lived in a convent founded by St. Galla in Rome (6th century) 
 Saint Edbert, Bishop of Lindisfarne (698)
 Saint Petronax of Monte Cassino (c. 747)

Post-Schism Orthodox Saint
 Saint Vladimir II Monomakh (Volodymyr Monomakh), Sovereign of Kievan Rus' (1125) 
 Venerable Micah (Micheas), the disciple of the Saint Sergius of Radonezh (1385)
 Venerable Sinaites of Serbia (from Ravanica) (14th century):
 Romilus of Ravanica; Romanus of Djunisa; Sisoes of Sinai and Sisojevac; Martyrius of Rukumije; Gregory of Gornjak; Zosimas of Tuman; and Gregory of Sinai (Mt. Athos) 
 Saint Seraphim of Mt. Domvu (Seraphim of Livadeia) (1602)
 Venerable Job of Pochaev, abbot and wonderworker (1651)
 Blessed Sophia of Kleisoura (Myrtidiotissa in Schema), the ascetic of Kleisoura, Fool-for-Christ (1974)  (see also: April 23. )

Other commemorations
 Translation of the relics (1238) of Saint Sava, first archbishop of Serbia (1235)
 Translation of the relics (1675) of Saint Pachomius of Nerekhta (1384)
 Commemoration of Theophylact Lopatinsky, Archbishop of Tver, Defender of Orthodoxy (1741)
 Birthday of Royal Martyr Tsar Nicholas II

Icon gallery

Notes

References

Sources
 Protection of the Mother of God Church, List of Saints (POMOG)
 May 6/19, Orthodox Calendar (PRAVOSLAVIE.RU).
 May 19 / May 6 , HOLY TRINITY RUSSIAN ORTHODOX CHURCH (A parish of the Patriarchate of Moscow).
 Dr. Alexander Roman. May. Calendar of Ukrainian Orthodox Saints (Ukrainian Orthodoxy - Українське Православ'я).
 May 6. Latin Saints of the Orthodox Patriarchate of Rome.
 May 6, The Roman Martyrology.
Greek Sources
 Great Synaxaristes:  6 ΜΑΪΟΥ, ΜΕΓΑΣ ΣΥΝΑΞΑΡΙΣΤΗΣ.
  Συναξαριστής. 6 Μαΐου. ECCLESIA.GR. (H ΕΚΚΛΗΣΙΑ ΤΗΣ ΕΛΛΑΔΟΣ). 
Russian Sources
  19 мая (6 мая). Православная Энциклопедия под редакцией Патриарха Московского и всея Руси Кирилла (электронная версия). (Orthodox Encyclopedia - Pravenc.ru).
  6 мая (ст.ст.) 19 мая 2013 (нов. ст.). Русская Православная Церковь Отдел внешних церковных связей. (DECR).

May in the Eastern Orthodox calendar